The Olympia Theatre, branded since 2021 for sponsorship purposes as the 3Olympia Theatre, is a concert hall and theatre venue in Dublin, Ireland, located on Dame Street.

In addition to Irish acts, the venue has played host to many well-known international artists down through the years such as Charlie Chaplin, Laurel and Hardy, David Bowie, Billy Connolly, Hall & Oates, R.E.M., Gary Numan, Radiohead and Adele.

The venue is owned by Caroline Downey of the music promotion company MCD Productions, with naming sponsorship provided under an eight-year deal with telecoms company, 3 (Three Ireland).

History

Origins
Dublin's Olympia Theatre started out as The Star of Erin Music Hall in 1879. The theatre was built on the site of a former saloon and music hall originally called Connell's Monster Saloon in 1855. It was renamed Dan Lowrey's Music Hall in 1881. In 1889 it was renamed again, this time to Dan Lowrey's Palace of Varieties. It was again renamed The Empire Palace in 1897 after undergoing a series of refurbishments. It was renamed the Olympia Theatre in 1923.

In September 2021, as part of an eight-year sponsorship deal with telecoms company Three Ireland, the venue was rebranded as the "3Olympia Theatre". The name-change which accompanied the sponsorship deal, reportedly prompted to "help the theatre recover from the COVID-19 pandemic", was subject to some controversy. The family of the former owners reportedly organising a petition against the change.

A branch of the River Poddle flows directly underneath the theatre.

Refurbishments
The possibility of demolishing the building was considered by the local council and the owners. Previous owners had attempted to get permission to demolish the theatre as early as 1970, despite a 1967 Dublin City Council resolution calling for the building's preservation. A scheme to replace the threatre with an office block, multi-storey car park and a smaller theatre were rejected. In November 1974, the Olympia was forced to close following major structural damage when parts of the proscenium arch and the ceiling above collapsed during a break in rehearsals for a production of West Side Story. A restoration fund was begun and Dublin City Council eventually placed a preservation order on the theatre. The theatre was restored and redecorated, allowing it to reopen on 14 March 1977.

In November 2004, a truck reversing on Dame Street crashed into the front of the Olympia, damaging the building. A cast-iron and glass canopy from the 1890s, by the Saracen Foundry in Glasgow, was demolished during the accident but subsequently restored. In 2016, the theatre was again refurbished. This time the building was completely refurbished at a cost of over €4 million with the venue remaining open during renovation work.

Performance history
The venue has hosted both domestic and international acts, including: 
Adele,
Ryan Adams,
Arcade Fire, 
Aslan, 
Barenaked Ladies,
David Bowie,
Charlie Chaplin,
Billy Connolly,
Chris Cornell, 
Dead Can Dance, 
Marina Diamandis,
Florence and the Machine,
Foo Fighters,
Kraftwerk, 
KSI,
Laurel and Hardy,
LCD Soundsystem,
Amy Macdonald,
Gary Numan,
Radiohead,
The Coronas,
The Killers,
The Script,
and Vulfpeck.

Tom Waits recorded his live version of "The Piano Has Been Drinking" here, released in 1981 on the Bounced Checks compilation. Comedian and actor Dermot Morgan recorded Dermot Morgan Live here on 16 April 1994. The 1995 film An Awfully Big Adventure shot a number of scenes at the theatre.

R.E.M. held a five-night residency at the venue in the summer of 2007 and used those sessions for their 2009 album Live at the Olympia. Kris Kristofferson recorded a live set at the Olympia for the special edition of his 2009 album Closer to the Bone. Erasure played two consecutive sold-out shows at the Olympia during their Total Pop! Tour in June 2011, recording footage used for the video of their single "When I Start To (Break It All Down)". The band played again in this venue in 2014 for two consecutive sold-out nights and in 2018 for three consecutive nights.

Tori Amos played her first European gig in the Olympia. In September 2015, Sweden's Eurovision Song Contest winner Måns Zelmerlöw kicked off a 17-date European tour at the venue. Paramore kicked off their European tour of their new album After Laughter from this theatre in June 2017.

Pantomimes
The Olympia, along with Dublin's Gaiety Theatre and The Helix Theatre, presents an annual Christmas pantomime. Its most recent productions have been Aladdin, Cinderella, Jack and the Beanstalk, Robin Hood and a revival of Cinderella which starred Jedward as the Fairy Godbrothers. In 2011, the Olympia pantomime featured Jedward once more in Jedward and the Beanstalk.

See also
 List of concert halls

References

Sources

External links
 

Concert halls in the Republic of Ireland
Music venues in Dublin (city)
Theatres in Dublin (city)